Mikko Herman Lipasti from the University of Wisconsin-Madison, Madison, WI was named Fellow of the Institute of Electrical and Electronics Engineers (IEEE) in 2013 for contributions to the microarchitecture and design of high-performance microprocessors and computer systems.

References

Fellow Members of the IEEE
Living people
Year of birth missing (living people)
Place of birth missing (living people)
University of Wisconsin–Madison faculty
American electrical engineers